Vengeance Is Mine is a 1949 British crime drama film directed by Alan Cullimore and starring Valentine Dyall, Anne Firth and Richard Goolden. It was produced as a low-budget second feature.

Synopsis
It stars Valentine Dyall as a wrongly imprisoned businessman who is told by his doctors that he is dying. He constructs an elaborate plan to hire a hitman to kill him and then frame the person, his former partner,  who put him behind bars. The supporting cast include Anne Firth, Sam Kydd and Richard Goolden.

Cast
Valentine Dyall as Charles Heywood
Anne Firth as Linda Farrell
Richard Goolden as Sammy Parsons
Sam Kydd as Stacy
Ethel Coleridge as Mrs. Briggs
Patsy Drake as Patsy
Alexander Wright as The Doctor 
Russell Westwood as Cass
Manville Tarrant as Man
Alex Graham as Barman
John Hart as Barman 
Arthur Brander as Richard Kemp
Roland Caswell as Police Sgt
Michael Bird as Policeman
Bob Connor as Garage Man
Betty Taylor as The Little Girl

References

External links

1949 films
British crime drama films
1949 crime drama films
British black-and-white films
1940s English-language films
1940s British films